WFXU (channel 57) is a television station licensed to Live Oak, Florida, United States, serving the Tallahassee, Florida–Thomasville, Georgia market as an affiliate of MeTV. It is owned by Gray Television alongside Thomasville-licensed dual CBS/MyNetworkTV affiliate WCTV (channel 6). Both stations share studios on Halstead Boulevard in Tallahassee (along I-10), while WFXU's transmitter is located in Hamilton County, Florida, between Jasper and Jennings.

Due to its transmitter being located on the eastern fringe of the Tallahassee–Thomasville market, WFXU's signal is unable to reach Tallahassee proper. In order to serve the entire market, WFXU is relayed on the second digital subchannel of WCTV (virtual channel 6.2, UHF digital channel 20.2) from that station's transmitter in unincorporated Thomas County, Georgia, southeast of Metcalf, along the Florida state line. This is the source of WFXU's on-air branding, WCTV 2.

History
WFXU began broadcasting June 15, 1998 as a full-time satellite of Fox affiliate WTLH, intending to improve that station's signal in the eastern part of the market. It broadcast an analog signal on UHF channel 57 from the transmitter location near Jasper. Originally owned by L.O. Telecast, Inc., WFXU was sold to KB Prime Media in 1999 and to WTLH owner Pegasus Communications in 2002 (the sale was approved because despite Tallahassee not having enough stations to support a duopoly under Federal Communications Commission (FCC) rules; Pegasus had helped fund WFXU's construction). That April, WFXU broke off from WTLH and became a UPN affiliate.

WFXU's signal was not nearly strong enough to cover the entire market. To make up for this shortfall in coverage, it launched WTLF on May 7, 2003 as a full-time satellite. Pegasus declared bankruptcy in June 2004 over a dispute with DirecTV over marketing of the direct broadcast satellite service in rural areas.

On April 1, 2005, WFXU and WTLF switched to The WB, via The WB 100+; UPN promptly signed with WCTV, which launched a new subchannel to carry the network. Prior to this, The WB was carried on a cable-only WB 100+ station, "WBXT", which was operated by WTXL-TV (channel 27). On January 24, 2006, The WB and UPN announced that they would merge to form The CW. It was announced on April 24 that WTLH would create a new second digital subchannel to become Tallahassee's CW affiliate. These plans were modified around August 2006 to make WFXU/WTLF the primary CW affiliate, with a simulcast on WTLH-DT2; this took effect when the network premiered on September 18.

Although most of the Pegasus station group was sold in August 2006 to private investment firm CP Media, LLC of Wilkes-Barre, Pennsylvania, WFXU was instead sold to Budd Broadcasting that November.  Since then, the station has operated intermittently as an independent station, with CW programming being seen only on WTLF and WTLH-DT2. More recently, it resumed operations from October 17 to November 14, 2010 and from November 12 to early December 2011 after being silent since November 2009; this was done in order to avoid forfeiture of the broadcast license.

In June 2008, WFXU applied to relocate its digital transmitter to west of High Springs, near Gainesville, with the intent of refocusing its viewership on that market. The FCC dismissed the application that December. The call letters were changed to WTXI on December 12, 2011, parking the call letters for a co-owned station in Miami; a week later, the station returned to WFXU.

This permit expired sometime in the late 2010s.

Gray Television agreed to purchase WFXU, along with translator WUFX-LD, on June 26, 2017 in a $600,000 deal. The sale made WFXU and WUFX-LD sister stations to WCTV in Thomasville, Georgia and WCJB-TV in Gainesville. The sale was completed on December 27.

As of September 14, 2013, WFXU returned to the air, this time as a Soul of the South affiliate; it then switched to Retro TV as of April 8, 2016. On April 30, 2018, WFXU became affiliated with MyNetworkTV and MeTV.

Subchannels
The station's digital signal is multiplexed:

References

External links

Television channels and stations established in 1998
1998 establishments in Florida
FXU
MeTV affiliates
Start TV affiliates
Decades (TV network) affiliates
Gray Television